Symphlebia neja is a moth in the family Erebidae. It was described by William Schaus in 1905. It is found in French Guiana and the Brazilian state of Amazonas.

References

Moths described in 1905
Symphlebia